Charles Powell Leslie was the name of three Irish politicians:

Charles Powell Leslie I (1731–1800), member of the Irish Parliament for Hillsborough (1771–1776) and Monaghan County (1783–1800)
Charles Powell Leslie II (1769–1831), son of Charles Powell Leslie I, who was Irish member of the UK Parliament for Monaghan (1801–1826) and New Ross (1830–1831)
Charles Powell Leslie III (1821 – 26 June 1871), son of Charles Powell Leslie II, who was member of the UK Parliament for Monaghan (1843–1871) and was Lord Lieutenant of Monaghan (1858–1871)